Bob Werckle (September 4, 1929 – August 25, 2005) was a college football player. A native of New Jersey, he was a prominent tackle for the Vanderbilt Commodores, captain of the 1951 team. He died in 2005.

References

American football tackles
2005 deaths
Vanderbilt Commodores football players
1929 births
Players of American football from New Jersey
People from Lebanon, Tennessee